Mogens Jeppesen (born July 10, 1953) is a former Danish handball player who competed in the 1980 Summer Olympics and in the 1984 Summer Olympics.

He was born in Gylling, Odder.

In 1980 he was part of the Danish team which finished ninth in the Olympic tournament. He played all six matches as goalkeeper.

Four years later he finished fourth with the Danish team in the 1984 Olympic tournament. He played all six match as goalkeeper again.

External links
 profile

1953 births
Living people
People from Odder Municipality
Danish male handball players
Olympic handball players of Denmark
Handball players at the 1980 Summer Olympics
Handball players at the 1984 Summer Olympics
Sportspeople from the Central Denmark Region